Vermont's 2012 general elections were held on November 6, 2012. Primary elections were held on August 28, 2012.

Governor

Incumbent Democratic Governor Peter Shumlin (since 2011) ran for re-election.

Lieutenant governor
Republican incumbent Phil Scott, who has held the position of Lieutenant Governor (since 2011) ran for re-election to a second term.

Cassandra Gekas, the former health care advocate for the Vermont Public Interest Research Group (VPIRG), sought the Democratic nomination to challenge Scott.

Republican primary
Incumbent Phil Scott was unopposed in the Republican primary.

Democratic primary
Cassandra Gekas was unopposed for the nomination.

Liberty Union
Ben Mitchell was unopposed for the nomination.

General election

Candidates
Ben Mitchell (LU)
Cassandra Gekas (D)
Phil Scott (R)

Results

Secretary of State
Democratic incumbent Jim Condos, who has held the position of Secretary of State of Vermont since 2011, is currently running unopposed in the primary as well as the general elections. Condos has also been nominated by the Progressive Party.

Liberty Union Party candidate Mary Alice Herbert was the sole declared candidate opposing Condos.  She declined to debate Condos. 

Condos received 86.6% of the votes cast for the office of SoS.

Treasurer
Democratic incumbent Beth Pearce, who was appointed to the position of Vermont State Treasurer in 2011, was elected to her first full term.

Wendy Wilton, the Rutland City Treasurer and former State Representative, was the Republican nominee. Don Schramm, a retired businessman, was the Progressive nominee for the third election in a row.

Attorney general
Incumbent William Sorrell, who had held the position of Vermont Attorney General since 1997, ran for re-election and defeated T. J. Donovan for the Democratic nomination.

Democratic primary results:

Sorrell, 21,124 (50.8%)
Donovan, 20,410 (49.1%)

For the general election, Jack McMullen, a businessman who ran for the U.S. Senate in 1998 and 2004, was the Republican nominee. Ed Stanak, a retired state employee and former president of the Vermont State Employees Union, was the Progressive candidate. Rosemarie Jackowski was on the ballot as the nominee of the Liberty Union Party.

In the general election, Sorrell won another term. The results were:

Sorrell, 164,441 (57.9%)
McMullen, 94,588 (33.3%)
Stanak, 15,629 (5.5%)
Jackowski, 8,533 (3.0%)
Write-in, 588 (0.2%)

Auditor

On May 18, 2012, incumbent Auditor Thomas M. Salmon announced he would not be running for re-election.

Republican Primary

Candidates
Vincent Illuzzi, Essex/Orleans State Senate

Results

Democratic Primary

Candidates
Doug Hoffer, self-employed policy analyst, nominee for Auditor in 2010

Results

General Election

Candidates
 Doug Hoffer (D/P)
 Vincent Illuzzi (R)
 Jerry Levy (LU)

Results

General Assembly

State Senate
All 30 members of the Vermont Senate are up for election. The state Senate currently consists of 20 Democrats, 8 Republicans, and 2 Progressives (who caucus with the Democratic majority).

Open seats
Chittenden: Democratic incumbent Hinda Miller is retiring.

Essex-Orleans: Republican incumbent Vincent Illuzzi is running for state Auditor.

Franklin: Republican incumbent Randy Brock is running for Governor. Democratic incumbent Sara Kittell is retiring.

State House of Representatives
All 150 members of the Vermont House of Representatives are up for election. The state House currently consists of 94 Democrats, 48 Republicans, 5 Progressives (who caucus with the Democratic majority), and 3 Independents (who also caucus with the Democratic majority).

Open seats
Caledonia-2: Democratic incumbent and House Majority Leader Lucy Leriche is retiring.

Caledonia-4: Republican incumbent Howard Crawford is retiring.

Chittenden-6-3 (Chittenden-3-3 prior to redistricting): Democratic incumbent Jason Lorber is retiring.

Chittenden-6-6: This is a new seat, with no incumbent.

Chittenden-6-7 (Chittenden-3-6 prior to redistricting): Democratic incumbent Kenneth Atkins is retiring.

Chittenden-7-4 (Chittenden-3-9 prior to redistricting): Democratic incumbent Bert Munger is retiring.

Essex-Caledonia: Republican incumbent Janice L. Peaslee is retiring.

Franklin-2 (Franklin-1 prior to redistricting): Democratic incumbent Gary Gilbert is retiring.

Franklin-3-1 (Franklin-3 prior to redistricting): Republican incumbent Dustin Allard Degree is seeking a state Senate seat.

Franklin-5 (Franklin-6 prior to redistricting): Republican incumbent Norman H. McAllister is seeking a state Senate seat.

Franklin-6 (Franklin-2 prior to redistricting): Democratic incumbent Richard Howrigan is retiring.

Lamoille-3 (Lamoille-4 prior to redistricting): Republican incumbent Adam Howard is retiring.

Orleans-1: Republican incumbent Robert Lewis is seeking a state Senate seat.

Rutland-6 (Rutland-7 prior to redistricting): Republican incumbent Joe Acinapura is retiring.

Windham-2-3 (Windham-3-3 prior to redistricting): Progressive incumbent Sarah Edwards is retiring.

Windham-Bennington-Windsor-1: Republican incumbent Oliver Olsen is retiring.

Windsor-2: Democratic incumbent Ernest Shand is retiring.

Windsor-4-2 (Windsor-6-2 prior to redistricting): Democratic incumbent Charles Bohi is retiring.

References

External links
Elections & Campaign Finance Division at the Vermont Secretary of State
Vermont at Ballotpedia
Vermont 2012 campaign finance data from OpenSecrets
Vermont Congressional Races in 2012 campaign finance data from OpenSecrets
Outside spending at the Sunlight Foundation

 
Vermont